My Human Time is the title of a twenty-four-hour-long promotional film, created for the now defunct startup Audiosnaps. The movie was recorded in a single take during November 2014, making it the longest advertisement ever recorded in a single take.
In the film, Marc Sallent appears sitting in front of the camera for the whole duration of the video, only talking to the camera to tell the time every minute.

See also
List of longest films

References

External links
 
 

Spanish avant-garde and experimental films
Advertisements
Promotional films